Highs may refer to:

 HiGHS optimization solver, an open source library for solving constrained optimization problems
 High-pitched screamed vocals as used in some extreme music genres, by contrast with low-pitched growled vocals ("lows")

See also